Khalaf Aziz (also Romanized as Khalaf ‘Azīz) is a village in Seyyed Abbas Rural District, Shavur District, Shush County, Khuzestan Province, Iran. At the 2006 census, its population was 833, in 156 families.

References 

Populated places in Shush County